Dieter Aderhold (27 November 1939 – 19 June 1989) was a German cathedratic and politician. He was a member of the Landtag of North Rhine-Westphalia from 1966 to 1970 and from 1980 until his death in 1989.

References

1939 births
1989 deaths
Members of the Landtag of North Rhine-Westphalia
Social Democratic Party of Germany politicians
Recipients of the Cross of the Order of Merit of the Federal Republic of Germany